Sigli–Banda Aceh Toll Road is a toll road that connects Banda Aceh to Sigli in Aceh, Indonesia. The Sigli-Banda Aceh toll road project began in 2018. This toll road is part of Banda Aceh-Medan corridor of Trans-Sumatra Toll Road network.

Sections
The toll road spans 74.1 km and is divided into six sections. The entire Sigli-Banda Aceh toll road is expected to operate fully by December 2021. The Indrapuri-Blang Bintang section (13.5 kilometers) was inaugurated in August, 2020. It is the first ever toll road in Aceh province.

Section 1 extending along Padang Tiji to Seulimeum, spanning a distance of 24.3 kilometers; 
Section 2, from Seulimeum to Jantho, 7. 6 kilometer s long ; 
Section 3,  Jantho-Indrapuri totaling 16 kilometers; 
Section 4 that stretches from Indrapuri to Blang Bintang for 13.5 kilometers; 
Section 5 Blang Bintang-Kuto Baro, with a length of 7.7 kilometers; and 
Section 6 Kuto Baro-Baitussalam that stretches for five kilometers.

Interchanges

Section IV has two interchanges namely the Indrapuri Interchange and the Blang Bintang interchange.

Toll gates
The Banda Aceh - Sigli toll road would have six intersections, seven toll gates, and two rest area facilities.

References

Toll roads in Indonesia
Transport in Aceh